The 2010 congressional elections in West Virginia were held on November 2, 2010 to determine who would represent the state of West Virginia in the United States House of Representatives. Representatives are elected for two-year terms; the elected served in the 112th Congress from January 2011 until January 2013.

West Virginia has three seats in the House, apportioned according to the 2000 United States Census. Its 2009-2010 congressional delegation consisted of two Democrats and one Republican, though following the election, its delegation consisted of two Republicans and one Democrat.

Overview

By district
Results of the 2010 United States House of Representatives elections in West Virginia by district:

District 1

This conservative district, rooted in the northern counties of West Virginia, has been represented by moderate Democrat Alan Mollohan since he was first elected to replace his father, Bob Mollohan, in 1982. Running for a fifteenth term, Mollohan faced a serious challenge in the Democratic primary from State Senator Mike Oliverio, who attacked the Congressman for his ethical violations. Ultimately, Congressman Mollohan was defeated by Oliverio, taking around 44% of the vote to Oliverio's 56%.

In the general election, Oliverio, the Democratic nominee, faced David McKinley, the Republican nominee and a former member of the West Virginia House of Delegates. McKinley and Oliverio traded barbs, with McKinley accusing his Democratic opponent of supporting the agenda of Nancy Pelosi and Barack Obama—to which Oliverio responded: "I am not going to Washington to get in touch with the Washington leadership. I'm going to Washington to get the national leadership in step with the people of West Virginia." In the end, Oliverio narrowly lost the election, despite Joe Manchin's victory in the special election.

District 2

This conservative district, which stretches from metro Charleston in western West Virginia to the Potomac River in the eastern region of the state, has been represented by Republican Congresswoman Shelley Moore Capito since 2001. Although Moore Capito faced serious challenges to her re-election in 2006 and 2008, she was not seen as vulnerable this year. The Congresswoman faced Democratic nominee Virginia Lynch Graf and Constitution Party candidate Phil Hudok in the general election, whom she was able to defeat in an overwhelming landslide to win a sixth term in Congress.

District 3

Incumbent Democratic Congressman Nick Rahall had represented this conservative-leaning district, based in the southern portion of the state, since he was initially elected in 1976. Rahall had not faced many serious challenges since he was first elected, but experienced a serious one from Spike Maynard, a former Democrat and a defeated former member of the Supreme Court of Appeals of West Virginia. In the general election, Maynard claimed that Rahall had received "money from a convicted terrorist," although Republican candidates such as George W. Bush also received money from the same individual; Rahall donated the contribution to charity. In the end, Maynard was unable to combat the popularity that Rahall had built in his thirty-four year congressional career and Rahall won an eighteenth term in Congress.

References

External links
Elections at the West Virginia Secretary of State
U.S. Congress Candidates for West Virginia at Project Vote Smart
West Virginia U.S. House from OurCampaigns.com
Campaign contributions for U.S. Congressional races in West Virginia from OpenSecrets
2010 West Virginia General Election graph of multiple polls from Pollster.com

House - West Virginia from the Cook Political Report

West Virginia
2010
2010 West Virginia elections